Strip Me? is the debut studio album by Japanese recording artist Anna Tsuchiya. A CD+DVD version of the album was released that included all of Tsuchiya's music videos released prior to the album, as well as the documentary SING or DIE

Single releases and uses
The songs "Rose" and "Zero" were used as the first opening theme and background music for the 2006 anime Nana, respectively. The two would later be compiled into a best-of album in March 2007, entitled Nana Best. "Lovin' You" was used as the theme song to the Japanese dub of the film Silent Hill. "Grooving Beating" was featured in a commercial for Whiteen, and "knock down" was used in the Kosé Cosmetics Visée commercial. "True Colors" is a cover of the Cyndi Lauper song.

Track listing

References

2006 albums
Anna Tsuchiya albums
2006 video albums
Avex Group albums